Fort Courageous is a 1965 American Western film directed by Lesley Selander and written by Richard H. Landau. The film stars Fred Beir, Don "Red" Barry, Hanna Landy, Harry Lauter, Walter Reed and Joe Patridge. The film was released on May 1, 1965, by 20th Century Fox.

Plot
An ex-cavalry sergeant, being escorted to prison after being convicted of a crime he didn't commit, finds himself leading the remnants of a unit that has been under Indian attack at a fort. The commanding officer has been killed, the Indians vastly outnumber them, and the only bargaining chip they have is the fact that they have captured the Indian chief's son.

Cast 
Fred Beir as Sgt. Lucas
Don "Red" Barry as Capt. Howard
Hanna Landy as Ruth Tate
Harry Lauter as Joe
Walter Reed as Doc
Joe Patridge as Soldier 
Fred Krone as Soldier
Michael Carr as Indian
George Sawaya as Indian
Cheryl MacDonald as Elizabeth Tate

Production
Parts of the film were shot at the Kanab movie fort, Johnson Canyon, and the Gap in Utah.

See also
List of American films of 1965

References

External links 
 

1965 films
1960s English-language films
20th Century Fox films
American Western (genre) films
1965 Western (genre) films
Films directed by Lesley Selander
Films scored by Richard LaSalle
Films shot in Utah
Western (genre) cavalry films
1960s American films